Ctenucha cajonata is a moth of the family Erebidae. It is found in Peru.

References

cajonata
Moths described in 1923